Ricky L. Stone (born February 28, 1975) is a former Major League Baseball pitcher.

Career 
He attended Hamilton High School and was drafted by the Los Angeles Dodgers in the 4th round of the 1994 amateur draft.

On December 13, 2007, Stone was included in the detailed Mitchell Report by Senator George Mitchell in which he was alleged to have used steroids throughout his career.

In 2008, Stone pitched for the Uni-President Lions of the Chinese Professional Baseball League.

Stone was at a Reds-Astros game in August  and later suffered a grand mal seizure at his home. His wife's CPR may have saved his life. On August 8, 2008, Stone was diagnosed with a brain tumor. He had surgery to remove the tumor and to perform a biopsy on the mass. It was confirmed that the tumor was indeed malignant.

See also
 List of Major League Baseball players named in the Mitchell Report

References

External links

http://www.oxfordpress.com/s/content/oh/story/sports/local/2008/08/09/hjn081008stoneweb.html

1975 births
American expatriate baseball players in Taiwan
Living people
Major League Baseball pitchers
Baseball players from Ohio
San Diego Padres players
Houston Astros players
Cincinnati Reds players
New Orleans Zephyrs players
Portland Beavers players
Louisville Bats players
Memphis Redbirds players
Sportspeople from Hamilton, Ohio
Uni-President 7-Eleven Lions players
Great Falls Dodgers players
Yakima Bears players
San Bernardino Spirit players
Savannah Sand Gnats players
San Bernardino Stampede players
San Antonio Missions players
Albuquerque Dukes players